Private Eyes (during production first known as The Code) is a Canadian comedy-drama television series based on the novel of the same name by G.B. Joyce, created by Tim Kilby and Shelley Eriksen starring Jason Priestley and Cindy Sampson as the two protagonist private investigators solving crimes in Toronto.

In Canada, the series first season of ten episodes premiered on May 26, 2016 on Global.  Seasons two (split into two nine-episode batches) and three were shown in Canada each summer from 2017 to 2019. The fourth season premiered in November 2020. In the United States, the series premiered on February 11, 2018 on Ion Television.

The fifth and final season premiered on July 7, 2021 on Global and premiered on Ion Plus on February 23, 2023.

Cast

Main
 Jason Priestley as Matthew Kevin "Matt" ("Shadow") Shade, a hockey player turned private investigator.
 Cindy Sampson as Angelina Susan "Angie" Everett, Shade's feisty boss and later P.I. agency partner at Everett Investigations. She inherited the agency after the death of her father.

Recurring

 Barry Flatman as Don Shade, Matt's father, a retired electrician who now owns the Red Bird Diner. 
 Jordyn Negri as Juliet "Jules" Shade, Matt's visually impaired daughter.
 Clé Bennett as Detective Derek Nolan (seasons 1-2), a police detective who is initially antagonistic towards Angie.
 Ennis Esmer as Detective Kurtis "Maz" Mazhari (seasons 1-3, 5), an old friend of Angie's who often helps her and Matt in their investigations.
 Nicole de Boer as Becca D'Orsay, Matt's ex-wife and host of a TV breakfast show.
 Jonny Gray as Liam Benson, Jules's boyfriend.
 Bree Williamson as Melanie Parker (season 2), a Crown prosecutor who hired Angie and Matt in the episode "The P.I. Code" to investigate jury tampering, later started dating Matt until the episode "Getaway With Murder."
 Mark Ghanimé as Dr. Ken Graham (season 2), Angie's ex-fiancé who appeared in the episode "Between a Doc and a Hard Place." They start dating again at the end of the episode and Angie finds Ken's engagement ring, discovering his plans to propose to her, but keeps this secret to herself. He officially proposes to her in the episode "Getaway With Murder," but she turns him down.
 Samantha Wan as Zoe Chow (seasons 2-5), a former client whom Angie hires as a secretary.
 Sharnon Lewis as Shona Clement (seasons 2-3), former owner of the Red Bird Diner.
 Kris Lemche as Deputy Eddy Conroy (seasons 2-4).
 Ruth Goodwin as Danica Powers (seasons 3-5), a rookie policewoman who works under Maz's supervision. She is later promoted to detective.
 Linda Kash as Inspector Mathilda Carlson (seasons 3-4), Maz and Danica's superior officer.
 Brett Donahue as Tex Clarkson (seasons 3-5), a private investigator from Seattle who encounters Angie and Shade after temporarily losing his memory. He has a long-distance romance with Angie. They break up after he asks to move in with Angie and she realises she is not ready for a serious relationship.
 Supinder Wraich as Kate Bashwa (season 4), Danica's girlfriend and later wife.
 Keshia Chanté as Mia (seasons 4-5), a paramedic and a friend of Angie.
 Elyse Levesque as Willow Maitland (season 4), an actress who briefly dates Shade after meeting him at a celebrity golf tournament.
 Kandyse McClure as Jada Berry (season 5), Angie's former high school nemesis turned school principal. She begins a relationship with Shade.

Guest stars
 Mimi Kuzyk as Nora Everett, Angie's mother, a former gambler and small time con (seasons 1-5). 
 Adam Copeland as Ben Fisk
 William Shatner as Norm Glinski, a rival P.I. and old nemesis of Angie (season 2-3). 
 Lucas Bryant as Sergeant Ellis (season 2-3)
 Colin Ferguson as Dominic Chambers (season 2-3) a con man who worked with Dana to distract Matt by pretending to be the brother of an old teammate while Dana uses Angie.
 Laura Vandervoort as Dana Edson (season 2-3).
 Charlotte Arnold as Jen
 Doug Gilmour as himself
 Daniel Negreanu as himself
 Kardinal Offishall as himself

Production and broadcast
A second season was confirmed and production started in fall 2016 in Toronto. On March 27, 2017, Ion Television picked up the exclusive rights to broadcast the series in the United States, where it is presented as an original series for the network, airing new episodes Tuesday nights with a rebroadcast episode on Sunday nights. The first half of the second season premiered in Canada on May 25, 2017 and concluded on July 20, 2017. The second half premiered on May 27, 2018 and concluded on July 29, 2018. On September 21, 2017, Global ordered a 12-episode third season set to start airing in spring 2019. On May 30, 2019, the day after season three premiered, Global renewed the series for a 12-episode fourth season to air in summer 2020. Production on the fourth season began in July 2019. Global and eOne announced on October 1, 2020 that season 5 production started for 8 new episodes to air in 2021. The season 5 limitation of only 8 episodes is due to the COVID-19 pandemic in Canada. In June 2021 it was announced the show would conclude with the fifth season.

Syndication
As of January 2021, Private Eyes is distributed internationally to 180 territories as well as on-line streaming.

Vehicle
Throughout the series Shade drives a silver '69 Porsche 911T. The car has a personalized licence plate SHADE 17.

Episodes

Series overview

Season 1 (2016)

Season 2 (2017-2018)

Season 3 (2019)

Season 4 (2020-2021)

Season 5 (2021)

Home video releases
The first season of Private Eyes was released on DVD on May 9, 2017.

References

External links
 
  Private Eyes at ION Television
 
 Private Eyes at TheTVDB

2010s Canadian comedy-drama television series
2010s Canadian crime drama television series
2016 Canadian television series debuts
2021 Canadian television series endings
Global Television Network original programming
Television series by Entertainment One
Television series by Corus Entertainment
Television shows set in Toronto
Television shows filmed in Toronto